The Second Mitchell Ministry was the 17th Ministry of the Government of Western Australia and was led by Nationalist Premier Sir James Mitchell. It succeeded the First Collier Ministry on 23 April 1930, following the defeat of the Labor government at the 1930 election on 26 March.

The ministry served at the height of the Great Depression. During its term, Norbert Keenan resigned from the cabinet following a dispute with the Premier, and Thomas Davy, widely touted as a future party leader, died.

The ministry was followed by the Collier Ministry on 24 April 1933 after the Nationalist coalition lost government at the state election held on 8 April. Half of the Ministry lost their parliamentary seats at the election, including the Premier.

The following ministers served, except where noted, for the duration of the Ministry:

References

 Hansard Indexes for 1930-1932, "Legislature of Western Australia"
 

Mitchell 2
Mitchell 2
Ministries of George V